Historias de sexo de gente común is a television show about common people's lives revolving around sex in Argentina, produced by Endemol and aired by Telefé.

References

Cast
Juan Gil Navarro
Carlos Santamaría
Jazmín Stuart
Carolina Peleritti
Silvia Kutika
Eduardo Blanco
Mónica Ayos 
Susana Lanteri

2000s Argentine television series
2004 telenovelas
2004 Argentine television series debuts
2005 Argentine television series endings
Argentine telenovelas
Telefe telenovelas
Spanish-language telenovelas